Rodolfo Schmitt Schefelis (born April 11, 1974) is a former field hockey player from Argentina. He competed for his native country at the 1996 Summer Olympics, where his national squad finished in ninth. He won the gold medal at the 1995 Pan American Games.

References
Profile

External links
 

Argentine male field hockey players
Field hockey players at the 1996 Summer Olympics
Olympic field hockey players of Argentina
Argentine people of German descent
1974 births
Living people
Pan American Games gold medalists for Argentina
Pan American Games medalists in field hockey
Field hockey players at the 1995 Pan American Games
Medalists at the 1995 Pan American Games
20th-century Argentine people